Voykovo is a rural locality (a selo) in Voykovsky Selsoviet of Konstantinovsky District, Amur Oblast, Russia. The population was 192 as of 2018. It consists of 6 streets.

Geography 
Voykovo is located 19 km east of Konstantinovka (the district's administrative centre) by road. Novopetrovka is the nearest rural locality.

References 

Rural localities in Konstantinovsky District